Shunkōsai Hokushū (春好斎　北洲), who is also known as Shunkō IV, was a designer of ukiyo-e style Japanese woodblock prints in Osaka who was active from about 1802 to 1832.
He is known to have been a student of Shōkōsai Hambei, and may have also studied with Hokusai.  He used the name Shunkō (春好) until 1818, when he changed his name to Shunkōsai Hokushū.  He was the most important artist in Osaka during the 1810s and 1820s and established the Osaka style of actor prints.

Notes

References
 Keyes, Roger S. & Keiko Mizushima, The Theatrical World of Osaka Prints, Philadelphia, Philadelphia Museum of Art, 1973, 266.
 Lane, Richard. (1978).  Images from the Floating World, The Japanese Print. Oxford: Oxford University Press. ;  OCLC 5246796
 Newland, Amy Reigle, The Hotei Encyclopedia of Japanese Woodblock Prints, Amsterdam, Hotei Publishing, 2005, Vol. 2, 488.
 Roberts, Laurance P., A Dictionary of Japanese Artists, Tokyo, Weatherhill, 1976, 49.

Ukiyo-e artists
19th-century Japanese people